Tikamgarh is a town and a tehsil in Tikamgarh district in the Indian state of Madhya Pradesh. The city serves as a district headquarters. The earlier name of Tikamgarh was Tehri (i.e., a triangle) consisting of three hamlets, forming a rough triangle. In Tikamgarh town there is locality still known as 'Purani Tehri' (Old Tehri). Until Indian independence in 1947, Tikamgarh, formerly called Tehri, was part of the kingdom of Orchha, which was founded in the 16th century by the Bundeli chief Rudra Pratap Singh, who became the first King of Orchha. The district is famous for the old fort of Kundar known as Garh Kundar, which was built by Khangars and remained the capital of Khangar rulers from 1180 to 1347.

Origin of the name
The district is named after its headquarter, Tikamgarh. The original name of the town was Tehri. In 1780, the ruler of Orchha Vikramajit (1776–1817) shifted his capital from Orchha to Tehri and renamed it Tikamgarh (Tikam is one of the names of Krishna).

History
The area covered by this district was part of the Princely State of Orchha till its merger with the Indian Union. The Orchha state was founded by Rudra Pratap in 1501. After merger, it became one of the eight districts of Vindhya Pradesh state in 1948. Following the reorganisation of states on 1 November 1956 it became a district of the newly carved Madhya Pradesh

Orchha was founded in the 1501 AD, by the Bundela chief, Rudra Pratap Singh, who became the first King of Orchha, (r. 1501-1531) and also built the Fort of Orchha. He died in an attempt to save a cow from a lion. The Chaturbhuj Temple was built, during the time of Akbar, by the Queen of Orchha, while Raj Mandir was built by 'Madhukar Shah ju Dev' during his reign, 1554 to 1591.

During the rule of Mughal Emperor, Jahangir, his ally, Vir Singh Deo (r. 1605-1627) reigned here, and it was during this period that Orchha reaches its height, and many extant palaces are a reminder of its architectural glory, including Jahangir Mahal (b. ca 1605) and Sawan Bhadon.

In the early 17th century, Jhujhar Singh rebelled the Mughal emperor Shah Jahan, whose armies devastated the state and occupied Orchha from 1635 to 1641. Orchha and Datia were the only Bundela states not subjugated by the Marathas in the 18th century.

Hamir Singh, who ruled from 1848 to 1874, was elevated to the style of Maharaja in 1865. Maharaja Pratap Singh ju Dev (born 1854, died 1930), who succeeded to the throne in 1874, devoted himself entirely to the development of his state, himself designing most of the engineering and irrigation works that were executed during his reign.
It was the oldest and highest in rank of all the Bundela states, with a 17-gun salute, and its Maharajas bore the hereditary title of First of the Prince of Bundelkhand. Vir Singh, Pratap Singh's successor, merged his state with India on 1 January 1950. The district became part of Vindhya Pradesh state, which was merged into Madhya Pradesh state in 1956.

Today Orchha is almost a nondescript town with a small population, and its importance is maintained only due to its rich architectural heritage and tourism. However the name of the Orchha State continued to be in use, as can be seen in the inscriptions of Jain tirth Paporaji, now on the outskirts of Tikamgarh.

Janaki temple  popularly known as the Nau Lakha Mandir (meaning "nine lakhs") in Nepal. The cost for the construction of the temple was about the same amount of money: rupees nine lakhs or nine hundred thousand, hence the name. Queen Vrisha Bhanu of Tikamgarh, India built the temple in 1910 AD.

In the reign of Jehangir, in 1618, Raja Veer Singh Deva Bundela of Orchha had built Keshavdeva temple at the cost of thirty-three lakhs in Mathura. A French traveller Tavernier visited Mathura in 1650 and had described the octagonal temple built in red sandstone. Italian traveller Niccolao Manucci who worked in Mughal court has also described the temple. Mughal prince Dara Shikoh had patronised the temple and donated a railing to the temple. The railing was removed by Mathura governor Abdun Nabi Khan on the order of Mughal emperor Aurangzeb and he built Jama mosque on the ruins of the Hindu temples. During the Jat rebellion in Mathura, Abdul Nabi Khan was killed in 1669. Aurangzeb attacked Mathura and destroyed that Keshavdeva temple in 1670 and built Shahi Eidgah in its place.

Climate

Demographics
As per 2011 Indian Census, Tikamgarh has a population of 79,106, of which 41,399 are males and 37,707 are females. Population in the age range of 0 to 6 years is 9,376. It has an average literacy rate of 74.9%, with male literacy of 79.2% and 70.3% female literacy. The effective literacy rate of 7+ population of Tikamgarh was 85.0%, of which male literacy rate was 90.0% and female literacy rate was 79.6%. The Scheduled Castes and Scheduled Tribes population was 11,779 and 1,424 respectively. Tikamgarh had 14587 household in 2011.

Administration
Tikamgarh has 27 wards.

Industry
Tikamgarh has emerged as a major center for brass statues. While the metalcrafting tradition in small towns has decline with the emergence of major trade centers. the tradition of casting bronze statues was established by Bhainalal Soni in 1950s, who traditionally made silver ornaments in the local style. The President of Indian has awarded Harish Soni and Dhaniran Soni for their craftsmanship.

Transportation

Roads

 About 20,000 of vehicles are running on Tikamgarh city roads including light and heavy vehicles.
 There are daily service of buses for every part of state.
Highways Passing from Tikamgarh Are, NH-12A, SH-37, SH-10.
 Dr. Syama Prasad Mookerjee Bus Stand Daily service of Buses for New Delhi, Lalitpur, Nagpur, Kanpur, Indore, Bhopal, Jhansi, Gwalior, Jabalpur are also there.

Railways
The construction of railway line to Tikamgarh has been completed in 2012. On 26 April 2013 was connected with railway services. The rail services begun from Lalitpur (Uttar Pradesh) to Tikamgarh and was started under the Lalitpur-Singrauli Rail Project. The first train to travel between the two stations was Tikamgarh-Jhansi (Uttar Pradesh) passenger train. The train was sanctioned between the two stations in the Rail Budget of 2012–13. The railway line between Tikamgarh and Lalitpur rail route is 52 kilometre long. Union Minister Pradeep Jain flagged off the train at Lalitpur station.

Airways
Khajuraho is the nearest (125 km) airport from where daily flights operate for Delhi and Agra.

Places of interest
Places of interest within 10 km include:
Kundeshwar
Paporaji

Education
Tikamgarh has many schools and colleges.

 Bhagwan Mahaveer Baal Sanskar School
 Maharshi Vidhya Mandir
 Hope Academy
 Angles Academy
 Saroj convent higher secondary school

Radio and television station
Tikamgarh catches radio station of All India Radio (आकाशवाणी) under Prasar Bharati at '675 kHz from Chhatarpur & 92.7 Big FM  from Jhansi. Tikamgarh has its own Doordarshan Kendra established in 2008.

Notable people
 Asgari Bai
 Uma Bharati
 Keshavdas
 Mrinal Pande
 Rahul Singh Lodhi - MLA of Khargapur (Vidhan Sabha constituency)
Rajendra Nath, Noted Bollywood Hindi film Actor
 Dr. Virendra Kumar, Cabinet Minister, Government of India

See also
 Orchha
 Kundeshwar
 Bundelkhand
 Prithvipur
 Khajuraho
 Badagaon

References

External links

 
Cities in Bundelkhand